Diego Garcia is a novel by Natasha Soobramanien and Luke Williams, published in 2022 by Fitzcarraldo Editions, which won the Goldsmiths Prize in that year. It is the first collaborative novel to win the Goldsmiths Prize.

Critical reception and reviews 
Tom Gatti of New Statesman wrote that "Political narratives are questioned, social structures reimagined and, in this exhilarating, generous novel, the act of storytelling is made new". The book has been reviewed in The Guardian, Buzz Magazine, The Times Literary Supplement, 3:AM Magazine.

References 

Goldsmiths Prize-winning works
2022 British novels
Collaborative novels